Cromer House, also known as Hogan Farm, is a historic home located near Childress, US. The farmhouse was built about 1860 and is a two-story, three-bay, rectangular single pen log structure. It has a massive brick chimney constructed of oversized bricks with pencilled mortar joints. It has a two-story, frame lean-to addition and a frame wing added in the 1930s. Also on the property is a contributing 19th century frame spring house.

It was listed on the National Register of Historic Places in 1989.

References

Houses on the National Register of Historic Places in Virginia
Houses completed in 1860
Houses in Montgomery County, Virginia
National Register of Historic Places in Montgomery County, Virginia